Prairie Rose State Park is a  state park in Shelby County, Iowa, United States, located near the city of Harlan. The park, which was established in 1962, surrounds the  Prairie Rose Lake, a manmade reservoir created in the 1950s. Both the lake and the park were named after the defunct community of Prairie Rose.

Recreational opportunities at the park include boating and fishing on the lake, which has two boat ramps and several jetties along with an overnight fishing area. Fish living in the lake include bass, bluegill, channel catfish, and crappie. The lake also features a sand beach with a volleyball court and playground. Aside from the lake, the park contains  of multi-use trails and an interpretive trail. The park has two campgrounds, each of which includes a cabin and electric and non-electric campsites.

References

External links

State parks of Iowa
Protected areas of Shelby County, Iowa